Italy competed at the 1920 Summer Olympics in Antwerp, Belgium. 174 competitors, 173 men and 1 woman, took part in 79 events in 18 sports.

Medalists

Gold

Silver
 Ettore Caffaratti, Garibaldi Spighi, Giulio Cacciandra and Carlo Asinari — Equestrian, Men's Team three-day event
 Alessandro Valerio — Equestrian, Individual jumping
 Aldo Nadi — Fencing, Men's Individual Sabre
 Pietro Annoni and Erminio Dones — Rowing, Men's double scull (2x)
 Pietro Bianchi — Weightlifting, Middleweight

Bronze
 Ernesto Ambrosini — Athletics, Men's 3000m steeplechase
 Valerio Arri — Athletics, Men's marathon
 Edoardo Garzena — Boxing, Featherweight
 Ettore Caffaratti — Equestrian, Individual three-day event
 Ettore Caffaratti, Giulio Cacciandra, Alessandro Alvisi and Carlo Asinari — Equestrian, Team jumping

Aquatics

Diving

A single diver represented Italy in 1920. It was the nation's third appearance in the sport. De Sanctis was unable to advance past the first round in either of his two events.

 Men

Ranks given are within the semifinal group.

Swimming

Four swimmers, all men, represented Italy in 1920. It was the nation's fourth appearance in the sport. None of the individual swimmers advanced to the finals, though the relay did advance before finishing fifth in the final.

Ranks given are within the heat.

 Men

Water polo

Italy competed in the Olympic water polo tournament for the first time in 1920. The Bergvall System was in use at the time. Italy forfeited its round of 16 match with Spain, then was defeated by Greece in the bronze medal tournament.
Squad

 Round of 16

 Italy forfeited the match.

 Bronze medal quarterfinals

 Final rank 11th

Athletics

24 athletes represented Italy in 1920. It was the nation's fourth appearance in athletics. Frigerio gave the nation its first gold medals in the sport by winning both of the racewalking competitions. Italy's long-distance successes also included a bronze in the marathon and a bronze in the steeplechase. Overall, the nation placed fourth on the athletics medals leaderboard.

Ranks given are within the heat.

Boxing 

Five boxers represented Italy at the 1920 Games. It was the nation's debut in boxing. Garzena had the best performance for Italy, taking all three of the nation's wins on his way to a bronze medal.

Cycling

Twelve cyclists represented Italy in 1920. It was the nation's third appearance in the sport. Italy took its first Olympic cycling medal when its pursuit team won the gold. Italy also had three cyclists place in the top eight of the 50 kilometres event, though none was able to secure a medal.

Road cycling

Track cycling

Ranks given are within the heat.

Equestrian

Ten equestrians represented Italy in 1920. It was the nation's second appearance in the sport. The Italian equestrians were fairly successful, winning five medals to take third place on the equestrian leader board for the Games. Italians took the top two spots in the individual jumping competition, as well as a bronze in the individual eventing. The nation also earned a medal in each of the two team events in which it participated, a silver in the eventing and a bronze in jumping (which, by the rules of the day, had to consist of entirely different riders than the individual jumping event).

Fencing

Nineteen fencers represented Italy in 1920. It was the nation's fourth appearance in the sport. The Italian fencers took five of the six gold medals; the individual épée was the only event not won by an Italian (Italy's best result in that event was sixth place). Nedo Nadi took the individual gold medals in the foil and sabre; both he and his brother Aldo were on all three of the gold-medal teams. Aldo Nadi also took a silver medal in the individual sabre.

Ranks given are within the group.

Football

Italy competed in the Olympic football tournament for the second time. The team beat Egypt in the first round before falling to France in the quarterfinals. In the tournament for second place, the Italians beat Norway before losing to Spain in the consolation semis.

 Team Roster
Piero Campelli
Giovanni Giacone
Antonio Bruna
Renzo de Vecchi
Virginio Rosetta
Gracco de Nardo
Ettore Reynaudi
Mario Meneghetti
Giuseppe Parodi
Luigi Burlando
Rinaldo Roggero
Giustiniano Marucco
Pio Ferraris
Giuseppe Forlivesi
Cesare Lovati
Enrico Sardi
Adolfo Baloncieri
Emilio Badini
Guglielmo Brezzi
Aristodemo Santamaria
Adevildo De Marchi

 First round

 Quarterfinals

 Consolation first round

 Consolation semifinals

Final rank 5th

Gymnastics

Twenty-seven gymnasts represented Italy in 1920. It was the nation's fourth appearance in the sport. The Italians took gold medals in both of the events in which they competed, with Zampori taking the men's individual all-around and leading the Italians to a team gold. Italy did not compete in the free system or Swedish system team events.

Artistic gymnastics

Modern pentathlon

A single pentathlete represented Italy in 1920. It was the nation's debut in the sport.

A point-for-place system was used, with the lowest total score winning.

Rowing

Six rowers represented Italy in 1920. It was the nation's third appearance in the sport. Italian rowers reached the finals for the first time, winning the nation's first two Olympic rowing medals: a gold in the coxed pairs and a silver in the double sculls.

Ranks given are within the heat.

Shooting

Ten shooters represented Italy in 1920. It was the nation's second appearance in the sport, and the first since 1896. Greece took a silver medal in the team military pistol, its first medal in shooting since 1896. Italy's best result was a fourth-place finish in the team standing military rifle.

Tennis

Four tennis players, three men and one woman, competed for Italy in 1920. It was the nation's debut in the sport. Balbi and Colombo reached the quarterfinals in the men's doubles, the best result for Italy that year.

Tug of war

Italy competed in the Olympic tug of war tournament for the first time in 1920, the final appearance of the sport in the Olympics. The Bergvall System was used in 1920. Italy lost its first match in the semifinals to the Netherlands. Because the Dutch went on to win the silver medal, Italy received an opportunity to contest the bronze. In the bronze medal semifinals, the Italians lost again, this time to the United States, to finish fifth and last in the tournament.

All matches were best-of-three pulls.

 Semifinals

 Bronze medal semifinals

 Final rank 5th

Weightlifting

Five weightlifters, one in each weight class, represented Italy in 1920. It was the nation's debut in the sport. No Italian weightlifter placed worse than sixth, with two winning medals (including Bottino's gold) and two others just missing with fourth-place finishes.

Wrestling

Eight wrestlers, all in the Greco-Roman style, competed for Italy in 1920. It was the nation's third appearance in the sport. None of the Italian wrestlers advanced past the quarterfinals, or qualified for the silver or bronze rounds.

Greco-Roman

Art Competitions

References

External links
 
 
International Olympic Committee results database
 

Nations at the 1920 Summer Olympics
1920
Olympics